Andrey Medvedev (born 16 August 1996), sometimes written as Andrei Medvedev, is a former Wagner Group mercenary. Medvedev became the first Wagner person to defect, seeking asylum in Norway on January 13, 2023, before being arrested later the same month.

Early life 
Medvedev grew up in Tomsk, Siberia, spending some of that time in an orphanage. At the age of 18 he spent a year in military service, deployed to Donbas in 2014.

Adult life 
Medvedev worked as a commander for Wagner Group, after agreeing to a four month contract on July 6, 2022, he told CNN. He fought in the 2022 Russian invasion of Ukraine, stating that he "fought in Bakhmut, commanding the first squad of the 4th platoon of the 7th assault detachment" and that he left Wagner later in July.

Prior to his mercenary work, Medvedev spent over four years imprisoned for robbery. He deserted from his mercenary employment in November 2022.

Defection and arrest 
At about 2 a.m. on January 13, 2023, Medvedev crossed the Norway-Russia border near the Pasvikdalen, becoming the first known Wagner Group member to defect. Upon arrival in Norway, Medvedev shared accounts of executions of Wagner deserters and acts that he described as terror-related. Medvedev stated that he feared being murdered with a sledgehammer, in a similar manner to Wagner defector Yevgeny Nuzhin. He reported that had twice tried to seek asylum in Finland, prior to reaching Norway. Wagner Group released a statement claiming that Medvedev had abused prisoners.

Medvedev's escape was supported by the Russian human-rights organisation Gulagu.net.

Two weeks later, Medvedev was arrested under Norway's Immigration Act and held in detention in Oslo, before being released. Members of the Ukrainian diaspora in Oslo have protested Medvedev's freedom in Norway and called for his prosecution.

Personal life 
Medvedev was aged 26 in January 2023.

References 

Living people
Russian mercenaries
Russian emigrants to Norway
Russian robbers
People of the 2022 Russian invasion of Ukraine
1996 births
People from Tomsk
Russian military personnel of the war in Donbas